Nikohl Boosheri is a Canadian actress. She is best known for her role as Adena El-Amin on Freeform's The Bold Type.

Biography
Boosheri was born in Pakistan to Iranian parents while her parents were fleeing Iran and moved to Canada when she was 2 months old. She has never been to Iran. She speaks English and Persian.

Filmography

Film

Television

References

External links

Living people
Actresses from Vancouver
Canadian film actresses
Canadian people of Iranian descent
Iranian expatriates in Pakistan
Iranian diaspora film people
1988 births